Sherbourne Street may refer to:

Sherbourne Street, Suffolk, England
Sherbourne Street, Toronto, one of the first streets in Toronto, Ontario, Canada